Dickey Peak is a mountain in Custer County, Idaho. At 3397m, it's the 14th highest peak in Idaho that has at least 500m of topographic prominence.

References 

Mountains of Idaho
Mountains of Custer County, Idaho
North American 3000 m summits
Salmon-Challis National Forest